Visalia is a city in the agricultural San Joaquin Valley of California.  The population was 141,384 as per the 2020 census.  Visalia is the fifth-largest city in the San Joaquin Valley, the 42nd most populous in California, and 192nd in the United States. As the county seat of Tulare County, Visalia serves as the economic and governmental center to one of the most productive agricultural counties in the country.

Yosemite, Sequoia, and Kings Canyon National Parks are located in the nearby Sierra Nevada mountains, the highest mountain range within the contiguous United States.

History

The area around Visalia was first settled by the Yokuts and Mono Native American tribes hundreds of years ago. When the first Europeans arrived is unknown, but the first to make a written record of the area was Pedro Fages in 1722.

When California achieved statehood in 1850, Tulare County did not exist. The land that is now Tulare County was part of the vast County of Mariposa. In 1852, some pioneers settled in the area, then called Four Creeks. This name came from the presence of numerous rivers like the Kaweah and its distributaries. These watersheds converged in the vast Kaweah Delta, which ran through the grand forest of valley oak in which Visalia was founded. Travelers through the city would comment on the beauty of the forest for decades after. The industrious group of settlers petitioned the state legislature for county status, and on July 10 of that same year, Tulare County became a reality.

One of the first inhabitants of a fort built by the settlers was Nathaniel Vise, who was responsible for surveying the new settlement. In November 1852, he wrote, "The town contains from 60–80 inhabitants, 30 of whom are children of school age. The town is located upon one of the subdivisions of the Kaweah River and is destined to be the county seat of Tulare." In 1853, that prediction became a reality and Visalia has remained the county seat since that time. Visalia is named for Nathaniel Vise's ancestral home, Visalia, Kentucky.

Early growth in Visalia can be attributed in part to the gold rush along the Kern River. The gold fever brought many transient miners through Visalia along the way, and when the lure of gold failed to materialize, many returned to Visalia to live their lives and raise families. In 1859, Visalia was added to John Butterfield's Overland Stage route from St. Louis to San Francisco. A plaque commemorating the location can be found at 116 East Main Street. Included in the early citizens were some notorious and nasty individuals who preyed upon the travelers along the Butterfield Stage route. Many saloons and hotels sprouted up around the stage stop downtown and commerce was brisk if a bit risky.

The next memorable event was the arrival of the telegraph in 1860. Visalians then could get timely information of the events taking place on the East Coast that would ultimately develop into the Civil War. During the war, many citizens of Visalia could not decide whether Visalia should stand on the side of the North or the South, so they simply had a mini Civil War of their own on Main Street. No one really knows the outcome of the war, but apparently it was concluded to the satisfaction of the participants and life returned to normal. The federal government, however, was not so easily convinced, and reacting to concern about sedition, banned Visalia's pro-South Equal Rights Expositor newspaper and established a military garrison. Camp Babbitt was built in 1862 to stop overt Southern support and maintain law and order in the community. During these Civil War years, Visalia was incorporated, which gave the town new rights.

The second incorporation in 1874 moved Visalia into city status with a common council and an ex-officio mayor and president. In 1893, the train bandits and murderers John Sontag and Chris Evans were apprehended, badly wounded, outside Visalia in what is called the Battle of Stone Corral. Sontag died three weeks later in police custody in Fresno; Evans was sent to Folsom State Prison. In 1904, the Visalia Electric Railroad was incorporated.

In October 1933, Visalia was the site of a fact-finding committee appointed by Governor James Rolph and charged with investigating labor violence in the San Joaquin cotton strike. Labor activist Caroline Decker led hundreds of strikers in a march on the courthouse, and led the questioning of strikers during the investigation. In the mid-1970s, the area was known for the serial burglaries of the then unidentified Visalia Ransacker. More recently, Visalia served as a host city for the Amgen Tour of California in 2009 and 2010.

Cityscape

The city is divided into neighborhoods, some of which were incorporated places or communities. Also, several independent cities around Visalia are popularly grouped with the city of Visalia, due to its immediate vicinity. Generally, the city is divided into these areas: Downtown Visalia, North Visalia, the Eastside, Southwest Visalia, the Industrial Area, Mooney, and the Westside.

Visalia has a rich architectural history, including many extant buildings dating to the mid- to late 1800s. Throughout the town center are many historic brick structures, including the Bank of Italy (currently Bank of the Sierra) and the Art Deco/Beaux-Arts Visalia Town Center Post Office, both of which are registered with the National Register of Historic Places. In addition to many other historic buildings and Victorian houses, Visalia is also home to a distinctive Fox Theatre, which was restored by a community group known as "Friends of the Fox" and currently serves as a live venue for music and stage performances.

Geography

Visalia is located at 36°19'27" North, 119°18'26" West (36.324100, −119.307347).

The highest point in the Visalia–Porterville area is Mount Whitney. The hilliest parts of the Visalia area are the Venice Hills and the entire Sierra Nevada foothills east of the city. Four main streams run through the city. The major stream is the St. John's River, which begins at the diversion dam in the Kaweah River and is largely seasonal. The others are Mill Creek, Cameron Creek, and Packwood Creek. Many smaller creeks also flow through the city. The Friant-Kern Canal runs just east of the city along the western edge of the Sierra Nevada foothills.

Geology
Visalia is subject to earthquakes due to its proximity to the Pacific Ring of Fire. The geologic instability produces numerous fault lines both above and below ground, which altogether cause around 10,000 earthquakes every year. One of the major fault lines is the San Andreas Fault. No major earthquakes have hit the Visalia area. Most quakes are of low intensity and are not felt. The San Joaquin Valley and metropolitan areas are also at risk from blind thrust earthquakes. Parts of the city are also vulnerable to floods.

Climate

Visalia has a semi-arid climate (BSk, under the Köppen climate classification), and receives just enough annual precipitation to stay out of Köppen's BWk (desert climate) classification. Visalia enjoys plenty of sunshine throughout the year, with an average of only 26 days with measurable precipitation annually.

However, temperatures frequently exceed  and occasionally reach .

Visalia averages  of precipitation annually, which mainly occurs during the winter and spring (November through April) with generally light rain showers, but sometimes as heavy rainfall and thunderstorms. Years of average rainfall are rare; the usual pattern is bimodal, with a short string of dry years (perhaps ) followed by one or two wet years that make up the average. While the Sierra Nevada mountains farther east in Tulare County tend to receive snow every winter, snowfall is extremely rare in Visalia. The greatest snowfall recorded in the city was just below  on January 25, 1999.

Importance of the valley oak
Visalia's Valley Oak Ordinance, adopted in 1971, regulates pruning and removing valley oak (Quercus lobata) trees. The area was once a dense oak woodland and the city is trying to maintain a healthy urban forest partly through preserving Mooney Grove Park, one of the largest valley oak groves in California. Also, just outside the city limits is the Kaweah Oaks Preserve, which is a  nature preserve. It protects one of the last remaining valley oak riparian forests in the San Joaquin Valley.

Visalia was the home of the minor league baseball team the Visalia Oaks for almost 30 years. The team's namesake was in recognition of the city's arboreal identity and had the mascot of Oakie, and later Chatter, both gray squirrels.

Environmental issues
Owing to geography Visalia suffers from air pollution in the form of smog, agricultural and other particulates. The Visalia area and the rest of the San Joaquin Valley are susceptible to atmospheric inversion, which holds in the exhausts from road vehicles, airplanes, locomotives, manufacturing, and other sources. Unlike other cities that rely on rain to clear smog, Visalia gets only  of rain each year; pollution accumulates over many consecutive days. Issues of air quality in Visalia and other major cities led to the passage of early national environmental legislation, including the Clean Air Act. More recently, the state of California has led the nation in working to limit pollution by mandating low emission vehicles. Particulate pollution can also be high during the winter due to frequent low-level inversions and during longer periods of dry weather. The same low-level inversions that cause high pollution levels in the winter also cause the frequent dense fog, locally known as Tule fog.

As a result, pollution levels have dropped in recent decades. The number of stage 1 smog alerts has declined from over 100 per year in the 1970s to almost zero in the new millennium. Despite improvement, the 2006 annual report of the American Lung Association ranked the city as the 11th-most polluted in the country with short-term particle pollution and year-round particle pollution. In 2007, the annual report of the American Lung Association ranked the city as the fourth-most polluted in the country with short-term particle pollution and year-round particle pollution. In 2008, the city was ranked the third-most polluted and again fourth for highest year-round particulate pollution.

Economy
The economy of Visalia is driven by agriculture (especially grapes, olives, cotton, citrus, and nursery products), livestock, and distribution and manufacturing facilities (electronics and paper products are significant manufacturing sectors). Light manufacturing and industrial/commercial distribution represent the fastest growing portion of Visalia's employer base.

Top employers
According to the city's June 2020 Comprehensive Annual Financial Report, the top employers in the city are:

Culture

In popular culture

Visalia was featured in several episodes of season two of the TV series 24, though many characters mispronounced its name. When the show was supposedly showing downtown Visalia, residents noticed there were Los Angeles palm trees in the scene.
Ken Park, a controversial 2002 film directed by Larry Clark and Edward Lachman, was filmed on location in Visalia. Never released in the United States, the film is much better known in Europe and abroad.
Kevin Costner attended Mt. Whitney High School for one semester in Visalia. His movie Bull Durham mentions the town's professional baseball team, the Visalia Oaks (now the Visalia Rawhide), which has been in Visalia for more than 60 years (book-ending a brief stint of the team as the Central Valley Rockies).
As a minor league team for the Oakland A's, the Visalia Oaks were mentioned twice during the 2011 movie Moneyball. 
The town is also mentioned in the book They Say, in which Ida B. Wells comments on the town being a hot and dusty small village.
In the film Big Trouble in Little China, Jack Burton's trucking company hails from Visalia. It can be seen on the passenger-side door early in the film.
Visalia appears in the video game Grand Theft Auto: San Andreas where it is parodied as Montgomery.

Media

The major daily newspaper in the area is the Visalia Times-Delta/Tulare Advance-Register owned by Gannett. A number of smaller regional newspapers, alternative weeklies, and magazines are published, including the Valley Voice. Many cities adjacent to Visalia also have their own daily newspapers whose coverage and availability overlaps into certain Visalia neighborhoods.

Sports
Visalia is home to the Visalia Rawhide (a "single-A" class team of the Arizona Diamondbacks) of Minor League Baseball. The Rawhide compete in the California League at Recreation Park.

It is also home to the Visalia Vapor Trailers, the longest-active official National Hot Rod Association (NHRA) car club.

Religion
About 233,293 Christians are in the metropolitan area (85,000 in the city proper). Churches of the Catholic, Methodist, Presbyterian. Lutheran, Baptist, Church of Christ, Assemblies of God, Church of Jesus Christ of Latter-day Saints, Pentecostal, Seventh-day Adventist Church, Eastern Orthodox Church, Oriental Orthodox Church, Mennonite, and other denominations can be found throughout the city. Some of the larger Protestant Christian congregations include Radiant Church, Visalia First Assembly, Neighborhood Church, Gateway Church, Grace Community Church, Christ Lutheran Church, Visalia Nazarene Church, and Visalia Community Covenant Church.

Visalia has a multiethnic population practicing a variety of faiths, including Judaism, Islam, Buddhism, Hinduism, Zoroastrianism, Sikhism, Baháʼí, Sufism. Immigrants from Southeast Asia have formed the Lao Buddhist Temple of Visalia, one of two Buddhist temples in the Visalia Area.

Education

Colleges and universities

College of the Sequoias, a community college, is the only public college located in Visalia.

Universities with branch campuses located within the city limits: 
 Fresno State
 Chapman University
 Fresno Pacific University
 Brandman University
Private colleges in Visalia include:
 San Joaquin Valley College
 University of Phoenix

Visalia is the only major city in the Central Valley with a population over 100,000 that does not have a local four-year university.

Visalia is also the largest primary statistical area in the United States without an NCAA member school.

Schools and libraries

Visalia Unified School District serves the entire city of Visalia, as well as several surrounding communities, with a student population of about 30,000. The Tulare County Public Library operates its largest branch, the Visalia Branch, in Downtown Visalia. There are other smaller libraries in Visalia, such as the Visalia Learning Center.

Transportation

Freeways and highways
California State Route 99, known as the Pearl Harbor Survivors Memorial Freeway, is the major north–south highway that heads north to Fresno and south to Bakersfield. California State Route 198 runs east to Sequoia National Park and west to San Lucas. California State Route 63, Mooney Boulevard, heads north towards Orosi and Kings Canyon National Park, and south to Tulare. California State Route 216, Lovers Lane, heads east to Woodlake.

Public transportation
Visalia Transit (formerly Visalia City Coach) operates public transportation to, from and within the communities of Visalia, Goshen, Farmersville and Exeter. The Visalia Transit also provides Dial-A-Ride curb-to-curb para-transit service on a shared-ride, demand-response basis to locations within the city limits of Visalia, Goshen and Farmersville.

Tulare County Area Transit (TCaT) provides the public transit services between Visalia and smaller communities throughout the greater Visalia area. Service includes Fixed Route and Demand Responsive services that are offered Monday through Saturday.

Orange Belt Stages has a bus stop in Visalia for commuting Amtrak rail passengers with Visalia as their final destination. The nearest Amtrak stations that offer commercial rail transportation services are located in Hanford and Fresno. 
The Sequoia Shuttle provides an alternative form of transportation from Visalia and Three Rivers to Sequoia National Park.

The Loop is an easy, safe and free way for all school-aged kids to get to community centers and recreation centers throughout Visalia where activities for youth are happening.

In late 2015, city officials unveiled the V-Line, a bus line that connects Visalia and Fresno. Its stops, in order, are the Visalia Transit Center, Visalia Municipal Airport, Yosemite International Airport, Fresno State University, and Fresno Courthouse. The bus fare is $10 each way. There are offers ranging from discounted to free for students, seniors, and disabled riders. This bus line has several amenities such as free WiFi and charging ports.

The California High-Speed Rail Authority has plans to build a high speed rail station 20 miles west of Visalia named Kings–Tulare Regional Station, which will service the city of Hanford as well as Visalia. Originally planned to be at-grade, the High-Speed Rail Authority has now built a viaduct crossing California State Route 198, which the station will be situated atop.

Air transportation
Visalia has one airport, the Visalia Municipal Airport .

Other nearby commercial airports include:

 Fresno Yosemite International Airport, owned by the city of Fresno; serves the San Joaquin Valley.
 Porterville Municipal Airport, owned by the city of Porterville; serves the Southeastern Sierra Nevada and the South Valley of the Porterville area
 Meadows Field Airport, also known as Kern County Airport #1, serves the South Valley

Demographics

The 2010 United States Census reported that Visalia had a population of 124,442. The racial makeup of Visalia was 80,203 (64.5%) White, 2,627 (2.1%) African American, 1,730 (1.4%) Native American, 6,768 (5.4%) Asian, 164 (0.1%) Pacific Islander, 27,249 (21.9%) from other races, and 5,701 (4.6%) from two or more races. There were 57,262 people (46.0%) people of Hispanic or Latino origin, of any race.

The Census reported that 123,116 people (98.9% of the population) lived in households, 606 (0.5%) lived in non-institutionalized group quarters, and 720 (0.6%) were institutionalized.

There were 41,349 households, out of which 18,102 (43.8%) had children under the age of 18 living in them, 21,219 (51.3%) were opposite-sex married couples living together, 6,508 (15.7%) had a female householder with no husband present, 2,909 (7.0%) had a male householder with no wife present. There were 3,282 (7.9%) unmarried opposite-sex partnerships. 8,383 households (20.3%) were made up of individuals, and 3,330 (8.1%) had someone living alone who was 65 years of age or older. The average household size was 2.98. There were 30,636 families (74.1% of all households); the average family size was 3.42.

The population was spread out, with 37,406 people (30.1%) under the age of 18, 12,461 people (10.0%) aged 18 to 24, 33,922 people (27.3%) aged 25 to 44, 27,779 people (22.3%) aged 45 to 64, and 12,874 people (10.3%) who were 65 years of age or older. The median age was 31.6 years. For every 100 females, there were 95.2 males. For every 100 females age 18 and over, there were 92.1 males.

The homeowner vacancy rate was 2.6%; the rental vacancy rate was 6.7%. 73,980 people (59.4% of the population) lived in owner-occupied housing units and 49,136 people (39.5%) lived in rental housing units.

2006–2008
According to the 2006–2008 American Community Survey, the racial composition of Visalia was as follows:

 White: 84.0% (Non-Hispanic Whites: 50.0%)
 Black or African American: 2.2%
 Native American: 1.8%
 Asian: 5.0%
 Native Hawaiian and Other Pacific Islander: 0.1%
 Some other race: 7.6%
 Two or more races: 2.9%
 Hispanic or Latino (of any race): 40.6%

African Americans make up 2.2% of Visalia's population. According to the survey, there were 2,574 African Americans residing in Visalia.

Native Americans make up 0.7% of Visalia's population. According to the survey, there were 827 Native Americans residing in Visalia.

Asian Americans make up 5.0% of Visalia's population. According to the survey, there were 5,762 Asian Americans residing in Visalia. The seven largest Asian American groups were the following:

 Other Asian (Cambodian, Laotian, Thai, Hmong, Lahu, Mien, etc.): 2.7% (3,092)
 Vietnamese: 0.7% (804)
 Filipino: 0.5% (597)
 Chinese: 0.4% (500)
 Indian: 0.4% (437)
 Japanese: 0.2% (237)
 Korean: 0.1% (97)

Pacific Islander Americans make up 0.1% of Visalia's population. According to the survey, there were 138 Pacific Islander Americans residing in Visalia.

Multiracial Americans make up 2.9% of Visalia's population. According to the survey, there were 3,350 multiracial Americans residing in Visalia. The four main multiracial groups were the following:

 White & Black: 0.4% (468)
 White & Native American: 0.9% (1,007)
 White & Asian: 0.5% (534)
 Black & Native American: 0.1% (68)

Hispanics and Latinos make up 40.6% of Visalia's population. According to the survey, there were 47,251 Hispanics and Latinos residing in Visalia. The four main Hispanic/Latino groups were the following:

 Mexican: 38.2% (44,397)
 Puerto Rican: 0.2% (177)
 Cuban: 0.1% (91)
 Other Hispanic or Latino (Guatemalan, Salvadoran, Honduran, etc.): 2.2% (2,586)

White Americans make up 84.0% of Visalia's population. According to the survey, there were 97,735 White Americans residing in Visalia. Much of the European American population is of German, Irish, English, Italian, Russian, Polish, and French descent.

Source:

According to the 2006–2008 American Community Survey, the top ten European ancestries were the following:

 German: 8.2% (9,486)
 English: 6.4% (7,445)
 Irish: 5.8% (6,726)
 Portuguese: 2.5% (2,983)
 Italian: 2.4% (2,792)
 French: 2.0% (2,278)
 Dutch: 1.6% (1,877)
 Scottish: 1.0% (1,178)
 Scotch-Irish: 0.8% (953)
 Polish: 0.7% (820)

Source:

2000
The 2000 census recorded 91,565 people, 30,883 households, and 22,901 families residing in the city, with a population density of 3,203.8 people per square mile. There were 32,658 housing units. As of the 2000 US Census, the racial distribution in Visalia was 54.9% White American, 2.3% African American, 6.0% Asian American, 2.4% Native American, 0.3% Pacific Islander, 20.3% from other races, and 4.2% from two or more races. 35.6% of the population was Hispanic or Latino (of any race).

The census indicated that 70.9% spoke English, 12.1% Spanish, 1.0% Lahu, 0.8% Mien, 0.7% Hmong, 0.6% Laotian and 0.5% Tagalog as their first language.

According to the census, 41.1% of households had children under 18, 54.9% were married couples, 14.9% had a female householder with no husband present, and 25.8% were non-families. 20.7% of households were made up of individuals, and 8.4% had someone living alone who was 65 years of age or older. The average household size was 2.91 and the average family size 3.37.

The age distribution was: 31.3% under 18, 9.6% from 18 to 24, 28.5% from 25 to 44, 19.7% from 45 to 64, and 10.9% who were 65 or older. The median age was 32. For every 100 females, there were 99.4 males. For every 100 females aged 18 and over, there were 88.9 males.

The median income for a household was $53,975, and for a family was $61,823. Males had a median income of $46,423, females $34,265. The per capita income was $23,751. 14.8% of the population and 13.2% of families were below the poverty line. 21.4% of those under the age of 18 and 9.4% of those aged 65 or older were below the poverty line.

Government

Local government

Like much of the San Joaquin Valley, more resident voters are registered in the Republican Party than the Democratic Party.

Of the 51,718 registered voters in Visalia; approximately 31.9% are Democrats and 49.1% are Republicans. The remaining 19.0% are Independents or are registered with one of the many smaller political parties, like the Green Party or the Libertarian Party.

Visalia is a charter city with a city charter approved by the electorate that acts as a "constitution" for the city. Until the November 2012 elections, Visalia voters at large, elected the five-member City Council that serves as the city's legislative and governing body. The city council members serve four-year terms, and they select one member to serve as mayor and one to serve as vice mayor. The City Council hires a powerful city manager that serves as executive officer, administers city operations, and carries out city policies. Every odd-numbered year either two or three members are elected by the people to serve a four-year term. Each March, the City Council meets and chooses one of its members as mayor and one as vice-mayor. The current mayor of Visalia is Bob Link and vice mayor is Steve Nelsen.

The City of Visalia had been threatened with a lawsuit from a network of civil-rights attorneys claiming the city violated the California Voting Rights Act, passed into law in 2002. On March 5, 2012, the Visalia City Council voted to put on the November 2012 ballot an initiative that changed the way that Visalia voters get to elect their city council. The measure passed and since the November 2016 elections, Visalia holds district elections in which the candidates must live in one of the five areas (or "districts") forming the city, and only residents of that area cast their votes.

List of mayors
This is a list of Visalia mayors by year.
 2003-2005 Bob Link
 2009-2011 Bob Link
 2011-2013 Amy Shuklian
 December 2016 – 2018 E. Warren Gubler

State and federal representation

Infrastructure

Post Office 

The United States Postal Service operates the Town Center Post Office at 111 West Acequia Avenue, the Visalia Post Office at 2345 West Beech Avenue, and the Millennium Post Office at 100 North Akers Street. The Town Center Post Office received listing in the National Register of Historic Places on January 11, 1985.

Notable people

Sister cities 
  Putignano, Italy
  Miki, Japan

See also

Central California
List of cities and towns in California
List of U.S. cities with large Hispanic populations

References

Further reading

California History, Bancroft

External links

 
 Experience Visalia
 Visalia Chamber of Commerce
 Visalia Convention & Visitors Bureau
 Visalia Magazine
 

 
1874 establishments in California
Butterfield Overland Mail in California
Cities in Tulare County, California
County seats in California
Incorporated cities and towns in California
Populated places established in 1874
San Joaquin Valley
Stagecoach stops in the United States